Bosnia is a live recording by the American rock band Grand Funk Railroad. The concert was a benefit performance for the nation of Bosnia and Herzegovina. It was recorded live 20 April 1997 at The Palace of Auburn Hills in Auburn Hills, Michigan.

Special guest performers included Peter Frampton, Alto Reed, Paul Shaffer, and the Detroit Symphony Orchestra.

The band later claimed that Capitol released it without the band members' knowledge or consent.

Track listing 
All songs written and composed by Mark Farner except where noted.

"2001: A Space Odyssey" (Richard Strauss) – 1:25
"Are You Ready" – 3:26
"Rock 'N Roll Soul" – 3:50
"Footstompin' Music" – 4:19
"Time Machine" – 3:17
"Paranoid" / "Sin's a Good Man's Brother" / "Mr. Limousine Driver" Medley – 7:17
"Heartbreaker" – 7:38
"Aimless Lady" – 3:53
"T.N.U.C." – 7:25
"Inside Looking Out" (Eric Burdon/Chas Chandler) – 10:22
"Shinin' On" (Don Brewer/Farner) – 3:37
"The Loco-Motion" (Gerry Goffin/Carole King) – 3:41
"We're an American Band" (Brewer) – 3:58

"Overture" (Jimmie Haskell) – 2:59
"Mean Mistreater" – 4:26
"Some Kind of Wonderful" (John Ellison) – 2:58
"To Get Back In" – 4:02
"Bad Time" – 2:57
"I'm Your Captain (Closer to Home)" – 9:04
"Loneliness" – 8:59

Personnel

Grand Funk Railroad 
 Mark Farner – acoustic and electric guitars, vocals, percussion
 Howard Eddy Jr. – keyboards
 Mel Schacher – bass guitar
 Don Brewer – drums, percussion, vocals

With 
 Peter Frampton – guitar
 Alto Reed – saxophone
 Michigan Symphony Orchestra conducted by Paul Shaffer
 Recorded by David Hewitt on Remote Recording Services Silver Truck

References 

1997 live albums
Grand Funk Railroad live albums
Capitol Records live albums